Stožec is a municipality and village in Prachatice District in the South Bohemian Region of the Czech Republic. It has about 200 inhabitants.

Administrative parts
Villages of České Žleby and Dobrá are administrative parts of Stožec.

Notable people
Adolf Pascher (1881–1945), botanist

References

Villages in Prachatice District
Bohemian Forest